Cheungbeia mindanensis, common name the Kawamura's turrid, is a species of sea snail, a marine gastropod mollusk in the family Pseudomelatomidae, the turrids and allies.

Description
The length of the shell attains 40 mm.

The elongate, ovate-fusiform shell is turreted. The dark white shell has a red band around the suture. It contains 12 whorls of which three, smooth and convex whorls in the protoconch. The consequent whorls protrude slightly, angular in the middle and slightly concave below. The ribs (13 in the penultimate whorls but becoming obsolete towards the base) in this species are flexuous and very oblique and continuous up the spire. But whether this latter be a constant character the author cannot say, as but a single example is at hand. The obtuse angulation of the body whorl at the periphery gives it a squarish aspect. The length of the aperture measures 3/7 of the total length. The outer lip is sharp and crenate at the margin. The columella is slightly twisted and tubercled at the top. The siphonal canal is slightly recurved.

Distribution
This marine species occurs off the Philippines, Vietnam and Taiwan.

References

 Liu J.Y. [Ruiyu] (ed.). (2008). Checklist of marine biota of China seas. China Science Press. 1267 pp
 Leung KF. & Morton B. (2003). Effects of long-term anthropogenic perturbations on three subtidal epibenthic molluscan communities in Hong Kong. In: Morton B, editor. Proceedings of an International Workshop Reunion Conference, Hong Kong: Perspectives on Marine Environment Change in Hong Kong and Southern China, 1977–2001. Hong Kong University Press, Hong Kong. pp 655–717

External links
 

mindanensis
Gastropods described in 1877